Macropholidus annectens, Parker's pholiodobolus , is a species of lizard in the family Gymnophthalmidae. It is endemic to Ecuador.

References

Macropholidus
Reptiles of Ecuador
Endemic fauna of Ecuador
Reptiles described in 1930
Taxa named by Hampton Wildman Parker